Olivier Perez (born 21 November 1978) is a Swiss actor. He has won an award for Best Actor in 2004 New York International Independent Film & Video Festival for his performance in the film Stranger Than Jim Morrison. He attended the International School of Geneva.

Filmography

References

External links 

Swiss male film actors
Swiss male television actors
Swiss people of Spanish descent
Actors from Geneva
1978 births
Living people
International School of Geneva alumni